The Forward Prizes for Poetry are major British awards for poetry, presented annually at a public ceremony in London. They were founded in 1992 by William Sieghart with the aim of celebrating excellence in poetry and increasing its audience. The prizes do this by identifying and honouring talent: collections published in the UK and Ireland over the course of the previous year are eligible, as are single poems nominated by journal editors or prize organisers. Each year, works shortlisted for the prizes – plus those highly commended by the judges – are collected in the Forward Book of Poetry.

The awards have been sponsored since their inception by the content marketing agency Bookmark, formerly Forward Worldwide. The best first collection prize is sponsored by the estate of Felix Dennis.

The Forward Prizes for Poetry celebrated their 30th anniversary in 2021.

Awards
The Forward Prizes for Poetry consist of three awards: 
The Forward Prize for Best Collection, £10,000
The Felix Dennis Prize for Best First Collection, £5,000
The Forward Prize for Best Single Poem in memory of Michael Donaghy, £1,000

The Prizes are run by the Forward Arts Foundation, which is also responsible for National Poetry Day. The executive director of the Forward Arts Foundation is Susannah Herbert.

Previous winners

Best Collection

Best First Collection

Best Single Poem

See also
 List of literary awards
 List of British literary awards
 English poetry
 List of poetry awards
 List of years in poetry
 List of years in literature

References

External links
 http://www.forwardartsfoundation.org/forward-prizes-for-poetry/

Awards established in 1991
1991 establishments in the United Kingdom
British poetry awards